Sanderson Farms is an American poultry producer which is based in Laurel, Mississippi. It is the third largest poultry producer in the United States and produces 13.65 million chickens per week.

On July 22, 2022, it merged with Wayne Farms to form Wayne-Sanderson Farms. The new company is controlled by a joint venture between Cargill and Conti (also known as Continental Grain Co. or ContiGroup).

In 2021, it was included in Fortune 500 list.

History 
The company was founded in 1947 by D.R. Sanderson, Sr.

In 1961, the company merged with Miss Goldy’s Chicken company.

In 1987, it became a publicly-listed company.

In 2020, the company made more than $3.5 billion, processing more than 4.8 billion pounds of meat. In 2021, the company employed more than 17,000 people.

In August 2021, it was announced that Sanderson Farms was sold to global food corporation Cargill, in a joint venture with Continental Grain Co. for $4.5 billion. The sale will combine Sanderson Farms with Continental subsidiary Wayne Farms to create a new, privately held chicken production company.

In March 2022, the finalization of the sale is uncertain due to the investigations from the United States Department of Justice; 
but on July 22, 2022, Wayne Farrms merged with Sanderson Farms to form Wayne-Sanderson Farms.

Plants
 Mississippi
 Louisiana
 Texas
 Georgia
 North Carolina

References

External links

2022 mergers and acquisitions
American companies established in 1947
Food and drink companies established in 1947
1947 establishments in Mississippi
Cargill
Poultry companies
Poultry farming in the United States
Meat processing in the United States
Meat companies of the United States
Brand name poultry meats
Agriculture companies of the United States
Food and drink companies based in Mississippi
Jones County, Mississippi
Meat packers
Companies formerly listed on the Nasdaq
1980s initial public offerings